Films produced in Spain in the 1990s ordered by year of release on separate pages:

List of films by year
Spanish films of 1990
Spanish films of 1991
Spanish films of 1992
Spanish films of 1993
Spanish films of 1994
Spanish films of 1995
Spanish films of 1996
Spanish films of 1997
Spanish films of 1998
Spanish films of 1999

External links
 Spanish film at the Internet Movie Database

Lists of 1990s films
1990s